Dimitrij Ovtcharov or Dmytro Ovtcharov (born 2 September 1988) is a Ukrainian-born German table tennis player. His father Mikhail (or Mikhaylo), a Soviet table tennis champion in 1982, moved his family to Germany shortly after Dimitrij was born.

Since 2008, Ovtcharov has won a total of two silver and four bronze medals at the Olympics. Ranked first January to February 2018, he is ranked ninth in the world by the International Table Tennis Federation (ITTF) as of November 2022.

Career
At the 2008 Summer Olympics in Beijing, Ovtcharov won the silver medal as part of the German men's team, together with Timo Boll and Christian Süß.

He used a special technique in his serves, which was later picked by Time magazine as one of the top 50 innovations of 2008.

On 22 September 2010, Ovtcharov had been suspended by the German Table Tennis Federation (DTTB) due to a positive A-sample test for Clenbuterol that may be used as a performance-enhancing substance. Ovtcharov himself denied the doping accusation and requested a B-sample analysis which still tested positive. After hearings and further investigations, the hair sample voluntarily offered by Ovtcharov showed no evidence of clenbuterol and its abuse. DTTB later unanimously decided to cancel the suspension on 15 October 2010. The decision was endorsed by ITTF.

At the 2012 Summer Olympics, Ovtcharov won bronze medals in singles and team events. In June 2015, he won a gold medal at the inaugural European Games. At the 2016 Summer Olympics, he was defeated by Vladimir Samsonov in the singles quarter-final. He then won a team bronze medal. In June 2017, he won the title at the China Open against Timo Boll (4 sets to 3), and in August 2017 he won the title at the Bulgaria Open. In January 2018, Ovtcharov became the World's Number 1 Table Tennis Player.

2021 
In March, Ovtcharov played in WTT Doha. He won the WTT Contender event and reached the semi-finals of the WTT Star Contender event. Notably, Ovtcharov made several key tactical adjustments to upset Lin Yun-Ju in the finals after losing to Lin in their previous four encounters.

As a result of his performance in Doha, Ovtcharov rejoined the top ten in the world rankings.

In June, Ovtcharov played in the European Table Tennis Championships, reaching the finals before losing to his German national teammate Timo Boll.

In July, two weeks before the Tokyo Olympics Ovtcharov withdrew from an internal German Olympic Scrimmage due to a leg injury.

Ovtcharov won bronze at the Tokyo Olympics in the men's singles event. Ovtcharov reached the finals of the men's team event, earning his record sixth Olympic medal.

Equipment
Ovtcharov is a right-handed player and uses the shakehand grip. He is a Butterfly-sponsored athlete. He uses the Butterfly Ovtcharov Innerforce ALC blade with Butterfly Dignics 09C on his forehand and Butterfly Dignics 05 on his backhand.

Personal life
Ovtcharov married Swedish table tennis player Jenny Mellström in 2013. Their daughter, Emma, was born in 2016.

Career records
Singles (as of 6 July 2013)
 Olympics: round of 16 (2008), Quarter-Finals (2016), bronze medal (2012, 2020).
 World Championships: round of 16 (2009, 2011, 2013, 2017), round of 64 (2015).
 World Cup appearances: 1st in 2017 5. Record: 5–8th (2008, 09, 10, 11), 3rd (2013, 2015).
 World Tour winner (9): 2010 India Open. 2011 Brazil Open. 2011 Korea Open. 2012 German Open. 2014 German Open. 2017 India Open. 2017 China Open. 2017 Bulgaria Open. 2017 German Open.  Runner-up (2): 2009 Danish Open. 2010 Polish Open.
 World Tour Grand Finals appearances: 9. Record: Runner-up (2014, 2017).
 European Championships: SF (2007), Runner-up (2020), Winner (2013, 2015).
 Europe Top-12: Winner (2012).
 Europe Top-16: Winner (2015, 2016, 2017).

Doubles
 World Championships: round of 16 (2009).
 Pro Tour winner (1): 2007 Chinese Taipei Open.
 Pro Tour Grand Finals appearances: 1. Record: QF (2007).

Mixed doubles
 World Championships: round of 64 (2007).

Team
 Olympics: Silver (2008), Bronze (2012), Bronze (2016), Silver (2020).
 European Games: 4th (2015).
 World Championships: 2nd (2010, 2012, 2014, 2018).
 World Team Cup: 3rd (2009, 2011).
 European Championships: 1st (2007–2011, 2013, 2017, 2019) 2nd (2014, 2015).

References

External links 
 
Dimitrij Ovtcharov at Table Tennis Media
 
 
 

1988 births
Living people
Sportspeople from Kyiv
Ukrainian emigrants to Germany
Naturalized citizens of Germany
German male table tennis players
Olympic table tennis players of Germany
Olympic silver medalists for Germany
Olympic bronze medalists for Germany
Table tennis players at the 2008 Summer Olympics
Table tennis players at the 2012 Summer Olympics
Table tennis players at the 2016 Summer Olympics
Table tennis players at the 2020 Summer Olympics
Olympic medalists in table tennis
Medalists at the 2020 Summer Olympics
Medalists at the 2016 Summer Olympics
Medalists at the 2012 Summer Olympics
Medalists at the 2008 Summer Olympics
World Table Tennis Championships medalists
Table tennis players at the 2015 European Games
European Games gold medalists for Germany
European Games medalists in table tennis